Dharmajivandasji Swami (18 June 1901 – 5 February 1988), commonly known as Shastriji Maharaj, was a Hindu saint, social worker and founder of the Shree Swaminarayan Gurukul Rajkot Sansthan. During his lifetime, he established branches of Swaminarayan Gurukul in Rajkot, Junagadh and Ahmedabad. Since he passed away, his followers have expanded the Shree Swaminarayan Gurukul Rajkot Sansthan all across India and around the world. Some of its main branches in India include Rajkot, Junagadh, Surat, Poicha (Nilkanthdham), Hyderabad, Taravada, and Bangalore. Its international branches include Dallas (Texas, USA), Paramus (New Jersey, USA), and Atlanta (Georgia, USA).

External links
Shastriji Maharaj - Swaminarayan Gurukul Rajkot

People from Rajkot district
1901 births
1988 deaths